Tsentralnyi District is an urban district of the city of Mariupol, Ukraine.

The district was established in 1939.

Demographics
According to the 2001 census, the population of the district was 187,362 people, of whom 8.34% had Ukrainian as their mother tongue, 91.12% - Russian, 0.12% - Greek, 0.08% - Armenian, 0.05% - Belarusian, 0.01% - Romani, Moldovan (Romanian), Bulgarian, Jewish and Polish, as well as German, Gagauz and Romanian (self-declared).

References

Urban districts of Mariupol